Acacia pritzeliana is a shrub of the genus Acacia and the subgenus Phyllodineae that is endemic to south western Australia.

Description
Like most species of Acacia it has phyllodes rather than true leaves. It blooms from April to June and produces yellow flowers.

Distribution
It is native to an area in the Goldfields-Esperance region of Western Australia from south of Coolgardie in the north down to around Esperance in the south where it is commonly situated on flats and plains growing in sandy, clay or loamy soils. The distribution of the shrub extends as far as Cape Arid National Park in the east. It is mostly found as a part of Eucalyptus woodland or open shrubland communities.

See also
 List of Acacia species

References

pritzeliana
Acacias of Western Australia
Taxa named by Charles Gardner
Plants described in 1939